SunStar Cebu, formerly stylized as Sun•Star Cebu (formerly Sun•Star Daily), is a community newspaper in Cebu City, the Philippines.  It is the flagship newspaper of the SunStar network of newspapers and is the leading newspaper in both Metro Cebu and the province of Cebu. It was named Sunstar Daily when it was first founded in November 25, 1982, and changed its name to Sunstar Cebu in 2000.

It is also the oldest of the SunStar newspapers, having been in continuous publication since 1982. Its main office is located along P. del Rosario St., Cebu City.

Awards
 "Best Newspaper" - Cebu Archdiocesan Mass Media Awards Hall of Fame (1991, 1992, 1993) 
 "Best Edited Daily" - Asia Media Project Konrad Adenauer Foundation and Philippine Press Institute (1997, 1998, 1999)

See also
SunStar Superbalita Davao
The Freeman Newspaper

References

External links
SunStar Cebu

SunStar
Publications established in 1982